March ör Die is the tenth studio album by British rock band Motörhead, released in August 1992. It would be the band's second and final album with WTG Records. The album features guest appearances by Ozzy Osbourne, Guns N' Roses guitarist Slash, and veteran drummer Tommy Aldridge. Aldridge stepped in after longtime member Phil Taylor was fired early in the recording process.

Background
After years of lackluster sales and feuds with record labels in the late 1980s, Motörhead had enjoyed an incredible turnaround by 1992. After the critical success of 1916, which was nominated for a Grammy, Motörhead secured a second album deal with Sony. In addition, frontman Lemmy had co-written four songs for Ozzy Osbourne's 1991 blockbuster album No More Tears at the invitation of Ozzy's wife and manager Sharon Osbourne, including "I Don't Want to Change the World'", "Desire", "Hellraiser", and the hit single "Mama, I'm Coming Home", generating much needed income. In his autobiography White Line Fever, Lemmy recalls:

Recording
The band reunited with producer Pete Solley, who produced their 1991 Grammy-nominated album 1916, to record March ör Die. Early in the recording, drummer Phil Taylor parted ways with Motörhead for a second time as his abilities and commitment came into question. Taylor had quit the band in 1984 to work on a new project with guitarist Brian Robertson but rejoined in 1987. In Joel McIver's Motörhead biography Overkill: The Untold Story of Motörhead, guitarist Phil Campbell discusses Taylor's second departure:

In the same book, Lemmy – while maintaining that Taylor's skills had deteriorated – admitted:

Following Taylor's sudden departure in the midst of recording an album, the band scrambled to find a replacement. Subsequently, March ör Die features three drummers: Taylor, Tommy Aldridge, and Mikkey Dee, who would later join the band as a permanent member until Lemmy's death. Another drummer, Garry Bowler (a.k.a. Magpie), worked on the drum track for the demo of "Stand" during a 1991 session in London with Würzel and Campbell. In the documentary The Guts and the Glory, Dee – who had earlier been asked to join Motörhead before he elected to join Dokken instead – spoke about replacing the longtime Motörhead member Taylor:  

Ozzy Osbourne duets with Lemmy on the track "I Ain't No Nice Guy", which also features Slash from Guns N' Roses on lead guitar. Slash also performs on the track "You Better Run". Considering that both Osbourne and Guns N' Roses were enjoying immense popularity at the time, "I Ain't No Nice Guy" seemed poised to become a major radio hit, but according to Lemmy's memoir Sony tried to suppress the single because it was utilizing WTG Records as a tax write-off:

The album includes a cover of the 1977 Ted Nugent classic "Cat Scratch Fever". The track "Hellraiser", earlier recorded and released by Ozzy Osbourne for his 1991 album No More Tears, appeared in the 1992 movie Hellraiser III: Hell on Earth. The band re-recorded "You Better Run" in 2004 as "You Better Swim" for The SpongeBob SquarePants Movie.

The March ör Die recording sessions took place in Los Angeles and coincided with the eruption of the Rodney King riots in the city. The studio where the band was recording lay in the path of the violence. Lemmy later recalled to Classic Rock Revisited:

Reception

Reviews for March ör Die were mixed. The AllMusic review states:

Track listing

Personnel
Credits adapted from the album's liner notes.
 Lemmy – lead vocals, bass, cello arrangements
 Phil "Zööm" Campbell – rhythm guitar & lead guitar; guitar solo on tracks 1–4 and 9–10
 Michael "Würzel" Burston – rhythm guitar and lead guitar; guitar solo on tracks 2–4 and 6–10
 Phil Taylor – drums on "I Ain't No Nice Guy"

Guest musicians
 Tommy Aldridge - drums on all tracks except "Hellraiser" and "I Ain't No Nice Guy"
 Mikkey Dee – drums on "Hellraiser"
 Peter Solley – keyboard, cello arrangements, production
 Slash – guitar solo on "I Ain't No Nice Guy" and additional guitar on "You Better Run"
 Ozzy Osbourne – vocals on "I Ain't No Nice Guy"
 Jamie Germaine - guitar

Production
Billy Sherwood – producer ("Hellraiser")
Casey McMackin – engineer
Lawrence Ethen – engineer
Tim Nitz – engineer
Tom Fletcher – engineer ("Hellraiser")
Steve Hall – mastering
 Dawn Patrol – art direction
 Merlyn Rosenberg – photography
Joe Petagno – Snaggletooth, album cover

Charts

References

External links
 

1992 albums
Epic Records albums
Motörhead albums
Albums produced by Billy Sherwood